Marshall Mzingisi Dlamini (born 13 August 1977) is a South African businessman and politician who was elected the Secretary-General of the Economic Freedom Fighters in December 2019. He has been serving as a Member of the National Assembly since April 2015. Dlamini has been an EFF member since its inception in July 2013.

Political career
Dlamini was previously involved in the African National Congress and its youth league. He was close to the league's former treasurer-general Sindiso Magaqa.

He became a member of the EFF in the early days of the party. Dlamini was in attendance at the party's launch at Uncle Tom's Hall in Soweto in July 2013. He was elected to serve on the Central Command Team, the party's highest decision-making structure.

He became a Member of the National Assembly in April 2015 following the expulsion of multiple EFF MPs. Dlamini was re-elected for a second term in May 2019.

Ahead of the EFF's second leadership conference in December 2019, The Sunday Times reported that supporters of EFF president Julius Malema had begun to lobby for Dlamini to succeed incumbent Secretary-General Godrich Gardee. At the conference, Dlamini was elected unopposed to the position. He is deputised by Poppy Mailola.

Incident
In February 2019, following the State of the Nation Address, Dlamini physically assaulted a member of the presidential security team due to a conflict between EFF MPs and the security.

References

External links
Mr Marshall Mzingisi Dlamini – People's Assembly
Mr Marshall Mzingisi Dlamini – Parliament of South Africa

Living people
1977 births
Members of the National Assembly of South Africa
21st-century South African politicians
South African pan-Africanists
Economic Freedom Fighters politicians